Robert Daniel Refsnyder (born , March 26, 1991) is a Korean American professional baseball second baseman and right fielder for the Boston Red Sox of Major League Baseball (MLB). He has previously played in MLB for the New York Yankees, Toronto Blue Jays, Tampa Bay Rays, Texas Rangers and Minnesota Twins.

Refsnyder was born in Seoul, South Korea, and adopted by a couple from Southern California when he was five months old. He became a three-sport star at Laguna Hills High School, and enrolled at the University of Arizona, where he played college baseball for the Arizona Wildcats as their right fielder. Winning the 2012 College World Series (CWS) with the Arizona Wildcats baseball team, Refsnyder was named the CWS Most Outstanding Player.

The Yankees selected Refsnyder in the fifth round of the 2012 MLB draft. They converted him from a right fielder into a second baseman, and he became one of their top prospects. He made his MLB debut in 2015, but did not become a regular for the Yankees. He was traded to the Blue Jays in 2017, and played for the Rays in the 2018 season. After spending the 2019 season in the minor leagues, Refsnyder made the Rangers' roster in 2020. He played for the Twins in 2021 and joined the Red Sox in 2022.

Early life
Refsnyder was born Kim Jung-tae in Seoul, South Korea. When he was five months old, he was adopted by Jane and Clint Refsnyder, a couple of German and Irish descent from Laguna Hills, California, through Holt International Children's Services. Three years before the Refsnyders adopted Rob, they had adopted a girl, Elizabeth, also from South Korea.

Clint, a former college basketball player at Muhlenberg College, never let his son win at anything, pushing him to compete at his best. Rob did not beat Clint at a pick-up game of basketball until he was 17. Refsnyder became a fan of the Los Angeles Angels of Anaheim of Major League Baseball (MLB), rooting for Vladimir Guerrero. He attended annual Christmas day games of the Los Angeles Lakers of the National Basketball Association with his father.

Amateur career
Refsnyder attended Laguna Hills High School in Laguna Hills, California, and he played baseball, basketball, and American football. He played as a wide receiver and outside linebacker for the football team in his junior year, and as the quarterback in his senior year. In his senior season, he was named his division's Offensive Player of the Year for the football team and co-most valuable player of the Pacific Coast League for the baseball team. Colleges in the Pacific-10 Conference recruited Refsnyder to play quarterback for their football teams.

Enrolling at the University of Arizona, Refsnyder played college baseball for the Arizona Wildcats baseball team in the Pacific-10 Conference. In his freshman year, in the 2010 season, Refsnyder batted .344 with two home runs in 57 games. He was an All-Pacific-10 Honorable Mention. As a sophomore, Refsnyder played in all 60 Wildcats games and batted .320 with six home runs. Refsnyder was a first team selection for the All-Pacific 10 Conference teams. After his sophomore season, Refsnyder played collegiate summer baseball for the Wareham Gatemen of the Cape Cod Baseball League.

As a junior during the 2012 Wildcats season, Refsnyder batted .364, leading the Wildcats with eight home runs, and recording 66 runs batted in (RBIs) and 14 stolen bases. In the first game of the 2012 College World Series (CWS), Refsnyder hit a home run. Refsnyder batted 10-for-21 (.476) in the 2012 CWS and the Wildcats defeated the South Carolina Gamecocks. He was named the CWS Most Outstanding Player.

Professional career

New York Yankees

Minor leagues (2012–2015)
The New York Yankees selected Refsnyder in the fifth round, with the 187th overall selection, in the 2012 MLB draft. Though he played as a right fielder for Arizona, the Yankees profiled Refsnyder as a second baseman. Refsnyder signed with the Yankees on July 6, receiving a $205,900 signing bonus. He reported to the Charleston RiverDogs of the Class A South Atlantic League, where he made his professional debut on July 10. He batted .241 for Charleston.

The Yankees assigned Refsnyder to Charleston to start the 2013 season. After posting a .370 batting average and a .452 on-base percentage (OBP) in 13 games, Refsnyder was promoted to the Tampa Yankees of the Class A-Advanced Florida State League on April 19. He batted .283 with a .408 OBP and a .404 slugging percentage in 117 games for Tampa, hitting six home runs and recording 51 RBIs.

Refsnyder began the 2014 season with the Trenton Thunder of the Class AA Eastern League. With the help of Marcus Thames, the Thunder's hitting coach, Refsnyder made changes to his swing that reduced unnecessary movement, resulting in an increase in his power output. He won the Eastern League Player of the Week Award for the week of May 26 – June 1. After batting .342 with six home runs in 60 games for Trenton, including a .430 average in his last 28 games, while also improving his defense at second base, the Yankees promoted Refsnyder to the Scranton/Wilkes-Barre RailRiders of the Class AAA International League on June 10.

After batting .371 with three home runs in his first 19 games with Scranton/Wilkes-Barre, Yankees general manager Brian Cashman described Refsnyder's progress as "pretty impressive", and added that "he's forcing us to pay attention." Cashman had Refsnyder play in the outfield to prepare for a possible promotion to the major leagues. Refsnyder finished the season with a .300 average, eight home runs, and 33 RBIs in 77 games for Scranton/Wilkes-Barre.

The Yankees gave Refsnyder an opportunity to compete for a spot with the major league team in 2015, but assigned him to Scranton/Wilkes-Barre to start the season so that he could continue to work on his defense.

Major leagues (2015–2017)
After he batted .290 with seven home runs, 17 doubles, and 37 RBIs in 81 games for the RailRiders, the Yankees promoted Refsnyder to the major leagues on July 11. With his callup, Refsnyder became the fourth position player in MLB history to be born in South Korea, following Hee-seop Choi, Shin-Soo Choo, and Jung-ho Kang. He made his major league debut that day, and recorded his first two hits, including a two-run home run, on July 12. After playing four games, where he batted 2-for-13 (.167), the Yankees optioned Refsnyder to Scranton/Wilkes-Barre to activate Carlos Beltrán from the disabled list. He batted .225 in the second half of the RailRiders' season.

The Yankees promoted Refsnyder to New York on September 1, 2015, as part of their September call-ups. Refsnyder played infrequently, with the Yankees initially using José Pirela, until late September, when he began to receive more regular playing time. He ended the regular season with a .302 average with two home runs, and started for the Yankees in the 2015 American League Wild Card Game, which they lost.

During spring training in 2016, the Yankees began to play Refsnyder as a third baseman. He competed with Ronald Torreyes for a utility infielder role with the Yankees for Opening Day. The Yankees chose Torreyes and optioned Refsnyder to Scranton/Wilkes-Barre on March 27. He played third base, second base, and right field with Scranton/Wilkes-Barre before the Yankees promoted him to the major leagues on May 17. Following injuries to first baseman Mark Teixeira and Dustin Ackley, the Yankees began to play Refsnyder at first base. He batted .262 in 122 at bats before he was optioned back to the RailRiders on August 11. He was again promoted to the major leagues as a September call-up. Refsnynder finished the 2016 season with a .250 average in 58 major league games, while he batted .316 in 54 games for the RailRiders.

After competing for a role on the Yankees' Opening Day roster for the 2017 season, the Yankees optioned Refsnyder to Scranton/Wilkes-Barre for the start of the season. The Yankees chose Pete Kozma, who could play shortstop, over Refsnyder. When the Yankees acquired David Robertson, Todd Frazier, and Tommy Kahnle on July 19, Refsnyder was designated for assignment to make room on their 40-man roster. Through July 19, Refsnyder had a .135 batting average in 37 at bats for the Yankees and a .312 batting average in 38 games for the RailRiders.

Toronto Blue Jays (2017)
On July 23, 2017, the Yankees traded Refsnyder to the Toronto Blue Jays for Ryan McBroom. The Blue Jays assigned Refsnyder to the Buffalo Bisons of the International League. After he played in four games for Buffalo, shortstop Troy Tulowitzki went on the disabled list, and the Blue Jays promoted Refsnyder to the major leagues on July 29 to provide infield depth behind Ryan Goins and Darwin Barney. Refsnyder made his debut with the Blue Jays later that day, pinch running in the ninth inning of a 6–5 loss to the Los Angeles Angels. As second baseman Devon Travis was also injured, Refsnyder got playing time with Toronto as a second baseman. Refsnyder batted .196 in 32 games for Toronto.

Tampa Bay Rays (2018)

The Cleveland Indians claimed Refsnyder from the Blue Jays off of waivers on November 20, 2017. He competed for a spot on Cleveland's 2018 Opening Day roster, but batted .191 during spring training. When setting their Opening Day roster, the Indians chose Brandon Guyer over Refsnyder, and traded Refsnyder to the Tampa Bay Rays for cash considerations on March 27, 2018.

The Rays included Refsnyder on their Opening Day roster and he batted ninth in the batting order as the designated hitter on Opening Day. Primarily playing against left-handed pitchers, Refsnyder batted .167 in 40 games before the Rays designated him for assignment on June 19. Refsnyder cleared waivers and was sent outright to the Durham Bulls of the International League. Refsnyder batted .283 in 51 games for Durham. Durham won the International League championship, and Refsnyder was named the postseason's most valuable player, as he batted .367 with two home runs and six RBIs.

Arizona Diamondbacks and Cincinnati Reds (2019)
Refsnyder signed a minor-league contract with the Arizona Diamondbacks for the 2019 season on November 20, 2018, receiving a non-roster invitation to spring training. The Diamondbacks assigned him to the Reno Aces of the Class AAA Pacific Coast League to start the 2019 season. He played one game for Reno, going 0-for-4 with one strikeout.

On April 7, the Diamondbacks traded Refsnyder to the Cincinnati Reds in exchange for a player to be named later or cash considerations. The Reds assigned him to the Louisville Bats of the International League. Refsnyder batted .315 with 10 home runs and 45 RBIs in 85 games for the Bats. The Reds released him from the organization in August.

Texas Rangers (2020)
Refsnyder signed a minor league contract with the Texas Rangers for the 2020 season on December 5, 2019. He made the Rangers' Opening Day roster in 2020, which had been delayed due to the COVID-19 pandemic. After hitting .200/.265/.233 without a home run in 34 plate appearances for the Rangers, Refsnyder was designated for assignment on August 24. He elected to become a free agent.

Minnesota Twins (2021)
The Minnesota Twins signed Refsnyder to a minor league contract with a non-roster invitation to spring training on December 17, 2020. He began the 2021 season with the St. Paul Saints. On May 15, the Twins selected Refsnyder to the active roster. With center fielders Byron Buxton and Jake Cave injured, the Twins had Refsnyder serve as the backup center fielder to Max Kepler, despite having never before played center field in the major leagues. 

When Kepler went on the injured list, on May 30, Twins manager Rocco Baldelli said that he had no choice but to "ride Refsnyder" in center field. He batted .320 in 16 games before going on the seven-day injured list due to concussion symptoms that began after he ran into the wall at Camden Yards while chasing a home run during the game of June 2. In his first game back, on June 8, Refsnyder strained his left hamstring while running out a double, and he went back onto the injured list. Refsnyder finished the 2021 season with a .245 batting average, two home runs, 12 RBIs, and one stolen base in 51 games. On November 5, 2021, the Twins outrighted him off of the 40-man roster, and he elected for free agency two days later.

Boston Red Sox (2022–present)
Refsnyder signed a minor league contract with the Boston Red Sox on November 30, 2021. The Red Sox invited Refsnyder to spring training, where he competed with Travis Shaw, Franchy Cordero, Christin Stewart, Jonathan Araúz, and Yolmer Sánchez for one of two available spots on Boston's Opening Day roster. Refsnyder opened the 2022 season with the Worcester Red Sox of the International League. After starting the season batting 14-for-35 (.400) for Worcester, he was added to Boston's active roster on April 19 after Araúz was placed on the COVID-related list, and made his debut with Boston on April 23 as the team's designated hitter. Refsnyder batted 2-for-5 with two doubles and one RBI in three games before he was returned to Worcester on April 29.

On June 10, the Red Sox selected Refsnyder's contract, adding him to the 40-man roster and promoting him to the major leagues. He served as a fourth outfielder until being placed on the injured list with a right knee sprain on August 2. He rejoined the team on August 16. The Red Sox placed Refsnyder on the injured list due to back spasms on October 3, ending his season with a .307 average, a .384 OBP, and six home runs in 177 plate appearances across 57 games played.

Personal life
Refsnyder met his wife, Monica (née Drake), while they were both students at the University of Arizona in 2012. She is an All-American swimmer and competed in the 2008 and 2012 United States Olympic trials, attempting to qualify for the 2008 and 2012 Summer Olympics. They married in December 2015. Johnny Field, a teammate with the Wildcats, was a groomsman. Their son was born in 2021.

Refsnyder is supportive of adoption, and hopes to adopt in the future. He helped to design a T-shirt with Athletes Brand to raise money for A Kid's Place, an organization in the Tampa Bay area that helps foster children. He also hopes to visit South Korea with his sister in order to learn about the culture of Korea and the Korean language.

See also
List of Major League Baseball players from South Korea
International adoption of South Korean children

References

External links

1991 births
American adoptees
American baseball players of Korean descent
American expatriate baseball players in Canada
Arizona Wildcats baseball players
Baseball players from California
Buffalo Bisons (minor league) players
Charleston RiverDogs players
College World Series Most Outstanding Player Award winners
South Korean adoptees
Living people
Major League Baseball first basemen
Major League Baseball left fielders
Major League Baseball players from South Korea
Major League Baseball right fielders
Major League Baseball second basemen
Minnesota Twins players
New York Yankees players
Tampa Bay Rays players
Texas Rangers players
Toronto Blue Jays players
Boston Red Sox players
People from Laguna Hills, California
South Korean emigrants to the United States
Baseball players from Seoul
Scranton/Wilkes-Barre RailRiders players
Tampa Yankees players
Trenton Thunder players
Durham Bulls players
Reno Aces players
St. Paul Saints players
Wareham Gatemen players
Worcester Red Sox players